Tennessee High School is a public high school located in Bristol, Tennessee, operated as part of the Bristol Tennessee City Schools school district. The high school serves almost all of the Bristol city limits.

History
The first official Tennessee High School opened in 1916 on Alabama Street.  The first part of the current campus was built in 1939.  The Bristol Municipal Stadium, also known as the Stone Castle, hosts football and soccer games and was built in 1936 as part of the New Deal.  Viking Hall, which opened in 1981, is Bristol Tennessee's civic center and the location of Tennessee High basketball games. According to legend, the school building is haunted.

Academics
The school offers two paths of study for students, a university path and a technical path.  The school offers Advanced Placement courses and participation in Army JROTC.
The school also has the oldest school newspaper in Tennessee, Maroon and White, which has been in publication for over 100 years.

Extracurricular activities
Each February, the school participates in a fund raising drive for the American Heart Association called "Queen of Hearts" with Virginia High School, Sullivan East High School and John S. Battle High School.

Athletics
Tennessee High won the 1972 High School Football National Championship as well as the 1971 and 1972 Tennessee state football championships.

Notable alumni
 Ernie Ford - entertainer
 Dave Loggins - singer and songwriter

References

External links
Tennessee High School website

Bristol, Tennessee
Educational institutions established in 1916
Public high schools in Tennessee
Schools in Sullivan County, Tennessee
1916 establishments in Tennessee